Jorge Mesqueu Neto (born 25 January 1991), known as Jorginho, is a Brazilian professional footballer who plays for Finnish club PS Kemi, as a midfielder.

References

1991 births
Living people
Brazilian footballers
Bangu Atlético Clube players
FC U Craiova 1948 players
Ħamrun Spartans F.C. players
Kemi City F.C. players
Liga II players
Maltese Premier League players
Veikkausliiga players
Association football midfielders
Brazilian expatriate footballers
Brazilian expatriate sportspeople in Romania
Brazilian expatriate sportspeople in Malta
Brazilian expatriate sportspeople in Finland
Expatriate footballers in Romania
Expatriate footballers in Malta
Expatriate footballers in Finland